The Bollenbach is a roughly 7.8-kilometre-long stream in the German state of  Baden-Württemberg within the county of Bodenseekreis. It is a right-hand tributary of the Argen.

Course 
The Bollenbach rises north of the Tettnang village of Obereisenbach from several springs that lie within the forest of Arlenholz. Thereafter it flows, canalized, in a southerly direction through countryside used for agriculture.
After Tannau, a village on the Upper Swabian Baroque Route, it passes through the Bollen woods. Here its course is more original. It continues southwards, running past Wiesertsweiler and through the village of Laimnau, where it finally empties into the Argen.

Tributaries 
From its source to its mouth the Bollenbach picks up the waters of many unnamed streams as well as the following tributaries:
 Flockenbach (l), south of Tannau
 Kreuzweiherbach (l), near Wiesertsweiler

See also
List of rivers of Baden-Württemberg

Rivers of Baden-Württemberg
Rivers of Germany